Luan Silva dos Santos (born 26 February 1999) is a Brazilian footballer who currently plays as a forward for Palmeiras, on loan from Vitória.

Career statistics

Club

Honours
Palmeiras
Campeonato Paulista: 2020
Copa Libertadores: 2020
Copa do Brasil: 2020

References

1999 births
Living people
Sportspeople from Salvador, Bahia
Brazilian footballers
Association football forwards
Campeonato Brasileiro Série A players
Esporte Clube Vitória players
Sociedade Esportiva Palmeiras players
Brazil under-20 international footballers